Nesta Davies is a British retired figure skater who competed in ice dance.

With partner Paul Thomas, she won silver at the third-ever World Championships in ice dancing in 1954.

Competitive highlights 
With Paul Thomas

References 

British female ice dancers